Khursatil is a rural locality (a selo) in Urginsky Selsoviet, Khivsky District, Republic of Dagestan, Russia. The population was 43 as of 2010.

Geography 
Khursatil is located 24 km northwest of Khiv (the district's administrative centre) by road. Atrik is the nearest rural locality.

References 

Rural localities in Khivsky District